The Kharkiv Regional Committee of the Communist Party of Ukraine, commonly referred to as the Kharkiv CPU obkom, was the position of highest authority in the Kharkiv Oblast, in the Ukrainian SSR of the Soviet Union. The position was created on February 27, 1932, and abolished in August 1991. The First Secretary was a de facto appointed position usually by the Central Committee of the Communist Party of Ukraine or the First Secretary of the Republic.

List of First Secretaries of the Communist Party of Kharkiv

See also
Kharkiv Oblast

Notes

Sources
 World Statesmen.org

Regional Committees of the Communist Party of Ukraine (Soviet Union)
Ukrainian Soviet Socialist Republic
History of Kharkiv Oblast
1932 establishments in the Soviet Union
1991 disestablishments in the Soviet Union